Kildare is a settlement in Prince Edward Island. It was named after Kildare in Ireland.

References

Communities in Prince County, Prince Edward Island